The curl-crested araçari or curl-crested araçari (Pteroglossus beauharnaisii) is a near-passerine bird in the toucan family Ramphastidae. It is found in Bolivia, Brazil, and Peru.

Taxonomy and systematics

The curl-crested aracari was first described by Johann Georg Wagler in 1831 but the spelling of its specific epithet was not corrected until 2020. It had at times been placed in the monotypic genera Beauharnaisius and Ulocomus.

The curl-crested aracari is monotypic.

Description

It gains its English name from unique curly, shiny, black feathers on the top of its head and nape; they resemble pieces of plastic or enamel. Males and females are alike except that the female has a shorter bill. Their bill has a brown-orange line at its base. The mandible is ivory becoming orangey at its tip. The maxilla has an orangey culmen and a maroon stripe along its lower part that is wider at the base. Between them the maxilla is green or bluish. It has indistinct ivory colored "teeth" along the tomium. Bare blue skin surrounds their eye, and their cheeks and throat are whitish with black speckles. Their upper back and rump are red and the rest of their upperparts are dark green. Their underparts are yellow with a wide red band across the lower breast. Their undertail coverts can have a red wash. Immatures are a duller version of adults.

Distribution and habitat

The curl-crested aracari is found in the southwestern Amazon Basin south of the Amazon River. Its range extends from northern Peru south of the Marañón River east into western Brazil to the Madeira River and southeast to the Xingu River. From Peru the range also extends south into northern and central Boliva and into Brazil as far as northern Mato Grosso. It inhabits the interior, clearings, and edges of wet forest both well-drained and swampy. It mostly occurs at elevations below  but is found as high as  near the Andes.

Behavior

Movement

The curl-crested aracari apparently makes short-distance or local movements but is otherwise a year-round resident.

Feeding

The curl-crested aracari usually forages in groups of up to 12 individuals, and usually in the canopy. It does feed at fruiting bushes near the ground. Its diet has not been detailed but is known to be mostly fruit. Its diet also includes eggs and young of other birds, and it is known to tear apart the nests of yellow-rumped caciques (Cacicus cela) to obtain them.

Breeding

The curl-crested aracari's breeding season appears to be mostly May to August but it may start earlier and extend longer. Its nest, eggs, and the rest of its breeding biology are not known.

Vocalization

The curl-crested aracari's calls include series of "deep 'rrek' notes, soft 'rrr' to hard, even grunting 'grenk' notes". It also makes a "softer 'et-et'" when settling into a roost. Another author adds a "low, raucous 'cha-cha-cha cha wruh cha--'."

Status

The IUCN has assessed the curl-crested aracari as being of Least Concern. It has a large range, but its population size is not known and is believed to be decreasing. No immediate threats have been identified. It occurs in Tambopata National Reserve in Peru. It is hunted, and "[m]ore data on this species’ biology are essential, in case it becomes necessary to protect it".

Gallery

References

Further reading
 John Gould and Henry Constantine Richter: A Monograph of the Ramphaastidae, or Family of Toucans, London 1854
 new edition: with 51 coloured tables and a preface by Jonathan Elphick: Taschen, Köln 2011

External links

Curl-crested Aracari videos on the Internet Bird Collection
"Curly-crested Aracari" photo gallery VIREO 
Photo-High Res; Trip Report tropicalbirding
Photo-Medium Res--(Dorsal View); Article nashvillezoo.org—"Ramphastidae"

curl-crested aracari
Birds of the Amazon Basin
Birds of the Peruvian Amazon
Birds of the Bolivian Amazon
curl-crested aracari
Taxonomy articles created by Polbot